Heliura baleris is a moth of the subfamily Arctiinae. It was described by Harrison Gray Dyar Jr. in 1910. It is found in Mexico.

References

 Arctiidae genus list at Butterflies and Moths of the World of the Natural History Museum

Arctiinae
Moths described in 1910